The British Book Awards or Nibbies are literary awards for the best UK writers and their works, administered by The Bookseller. The awards have had several previous names, owners and sponsors since being launched in 1990, including the National Book Awards from 2010 to 2014.

Book award history

The British Book Awards, or Nibbies, ran from 1990 to 2009 and were founded by the editor of Publishing News. The award was then acquired by Agile Marketing which renamed it the National Book Awards with headline sponsors Galaxy National Book Awards (2010–2011) (sponsored by Galaxy) and Specsavers National Book Awards (2012–2014) (sponsored by Specsavers).  There were no National Book Awards after 2014. In 2017 the award was acquired by The Bookseller and renamed to the original British Book Awards or Nibbies.

In 2005, The Bookseller launched a separate scheme, The Bookseller Retail Awards (winners not listed in this article). In 2010, running parallel to the National Book Awards, The Bookseller combined The Nibbies with its retail awards to produce The Bookseller Industry Awards (winners not listed in this article). In 2017 The British Book Industry Awards were renamed as The British Book Awards after it acquired the National Book Awards from Agile Marketing.

It is known as the Nibbies because of the golden nib-shaped trophy given to winners.

Award winners

Author of the Year

Book of the Year
Prior to 2010 the Best was a unique winner. Starting in 2010, the Best was chosen by the public via open internet vote from among the winning books in the other categories.

Children's Book of the Year 

Previously called British Children's Book of the Year. Renamed to Children's Book of the Year in 2010.

Fiction Book of the Year 
Previously called Popular Fiction Award. Name changed to Popular Fiction Book of the Year in 2010. Name changed to Fiction Book of the Year in 2017.
 2022 – Sorrow and Bliss – Meg Mason
 2021 – Hamnet – Maggie O'Farrell
 2020 – Girl, Woman, Other – Bernardine Evaristo
 2019 – Normal People – Sally Rooney
 2018 – Reservoir 13 – Jon McGregor
 2017 – The Essex Serpent – Sarah Perry
 2015 – (no award)
 2016 – (no award)
 2014 – The Shock of the Fall – Nathan Filer
 2013 – An Officer and a Spy – Robert Harris
 2012 – Fifty Shades of Grey – E. L. James
 2011 – A Tiny Bit Marvellous – Dawn French
 2010 – One Day – David Nicholls
 2009 – Devil May Care – Sebastian Faulks (Penguin)
 2008 – The Memory Keeper's Daughter – Kim Edwards (Penguin)
 2006 – Anybody Out There? – Marian Keyes (Michael Joseph)
 2006 – The Time Traveler's Wife – Audrey Niffenegger (Vintage)

Début Book of the Year
Previously called the Newcomer of the Year. Name changed to New Writer of the Year in 2010. Name changed to "Début Book of the Year" in 2017.

 2022 – Open Water – Caleb Azumah Nelson
 2021 – Shuggie Bain – Douglas Stuart
 2020 – Queenie by Candice Carty-Williams
 2019 – Lullaby by Leïla Slimani, translated by Sam Taylor
 2018 – Eleanor Oliphant is Completely Fine by Gail Honeyman
 2017 – What Belongs to You by Garth Greenwell
 2015–2016 – (no award)
 2014 – The Miniaturist by Jessie Burton
 2013 – Tigers in Red Weather by Liza Klaussman
 2012 – The Unlikely Pilgrimage of Harold Fry by Rachel Joyce
 2011 – When God Was a Rabbit by Sarah Winman
 2010 – The Hare with Amber Eyes by Edmund de Waal
 2009 – Child 44 by Tom Rob Smith
 2008 – Catherine O'Flynn – 
 2007 – Victoria Hislop –
 2006 – Marina Lewycka –
 2005 – Susanna Clarke –
 2004 – Brick Lane by Monica Ali
 2003 – Allison Pearson 
 2002 – Pete McCarthy 
 2001 – White Teeth by Zadie Smith
 2000 – Driving Over Lemons: An Optimist in Andalucia by Chris Stewart
 1999 – Borders UK –
 1998 – Daisy & Tom –
 1997 – Kate Atkinson –
 1990 – The Power of One by Bryce Courtenay

Crime & Thriller Book of the Year
Previously called the Crime Thriller of the Year. Name changed to Thriller & Crime Novel of the Year in 2011. Name changed to Crime & Thriller Book of the Year in 2017.
 2022 – The Dark Remains – Ian Rankin, William McIlvanney
 2021 – Troubled Blood – JK Rowling
 2020 – My Sister, the Serial Killer – Oyinkan Braithwaite
 2019 – Our House – Louise Candlish
 2018 – The Dry – Jane Harper
 2017 – Dodgers – Bill Beverly
 2015 – (no award)
 2016 – (no award)
 2014 – I Am Pilgrim – Terry Hayes
 2013 – The Carrier – Sophie Hannah (Hodder)
 2012 – A Wanted Man – Lee Child
 2011 – Before I Go to Sleep – S. J. Watson
 2010 – (no award)
 2009 – The Girl with the Dragon Tattoo – Stieg Larsson
 2008 – Book of the Dead – Patricia Cornwell (Little, Brown)
 2007 – The Naming of the Dead – Ian Rankin (Orion) 
 2006 – The Take – Martina Cole (Headline) 
 2005 – Fleshmarket Close – Ian Rankin (Orion)

Non-Fiction: Lifestyle Book of the Year 
 2022 – The Lyrics: 1956 to the Present by Paul McCartney, Paul Muldoon
 2021 – Skincare: The Ultimate No-Nonsense Guide by Caroline Hirons
 2020 – Pinch of Nom by Kay Featherstone and Kate Allinson
 2019 – BOSH! by Henry Firth & Ian Theasby
 2018 – 5 Ingredients by Jamie Oliver
 2017 – Hello, is this planet Earth? by Tim Peake

Non-Fiction: Narrative Book of the Year 
 2022 – Empireland by Sathnam Sanghera
 2021 – Diary of a Young Naturalist by Dara McAnulty
 2020 – Three Women by Lisa Taddeo
 2019 – Becoming by Michelle Obama
 2018 – Why I'm No Longer Talking to White People About Race by Reni Eddo-Lodge
 2017 – East West Street: On the Origins of Genocide and Crimes against Humanity by Philippe Sands

Bestseller Award 
Named Bestseller of the Year in 1991. Renamed Bestseller Award in 2017.

 2017 – Harry Potter and the Cursed Child – J. K. Rowling
 1992–2016 – (no award)
 1991 – Delia Smith's Christmas – Delia Smith (BBC Books)

Retired awards
The following awards are no longer active.

Biography/Autobiography of the Year
Previously called Biography of the Year. Name changed to Biography/Autobiography of the Year in 2010.
 2014 – Please, Mister Postman – Alan Johnson
 2013 – David Jason: My Life – David Jason (Random House)
 2012 – My Animals and Other Family – Clare Balding
 2011 – Charles Dickens – Claire Tomalin
 2010 – The Fry Chronicles – Stephen Fry
 2009 – Dreams from My Father – Barack Obama (Canongate)
 2008 – My Booky Wook – Russell Brand (Hodder & Stoughton)
 2007 – The Sound of Laughter – Peter Kay (Century) 
 2006 – Sharon Osbourne Extreme – Sharon Osbourne (Time Warner) 
 2005 – My Life – Bill Clinton (Hutchinson) 
 2004 – Toast – Nigel Slater (Fourth Estate) 
 2003 – Churchill: A Biography – Roy Jenkins (Pan)

Popular Non-Fiction Book of the Year
 2014 – Love, Nina – Nina Stibbe
 2013 – I Am Malala – Malala Yousafzai and Christina Lamb
 2012 – Is It Just Me – Miranda Hart
 2011 – How To Be a Woman – Caitlin Moran
 2010 – The Making of Modern Britain – Andrew Marr

Audiobook of the Year
 2014 – Awful Auntie – David Walliams
 2013 – The Ocean at the End of the Lane – Neil Gaiman, read by the author (Headline)
 2012 – The Woman Who Went to Bed for a Year – Sue Townsend, read by Caroline Quentin
 2011 – My Dear, I Wanted to Tell You – Louisa Young, read by Dan Stevens
 2005–2010 – (no award)
 2004 – Forgotten Voices of the Great War – Max Arthur (Random House) 
 2003 – Series of Unfortunate Events – written by Lemony Snicket, read by Tim Curry (Collins) 
 2002 – The Laying on of Hands – written and read by Alan Bennett (BBC Radio Collection)

Food & Drink Book of the Year
2014 – Plenty More – Yotam Ottolenghi
2013 – Eat – Nigel Slater (HarperCollins)
2012 – The Hairy Dieters – Si King and Dave Myers
2011 – The Good Cook – Simon Hopkinson
2010 – Plenty – Yotam Ottolenghi

Paperback of the Year
2011 – Room – Emma Donoghue

Outstanding Achievement
Previously called the Lifetime Achievement Award (1993–2009). Renamed to Outstanding Achievement Award in 2010.

 2014 – Mary Berry
 2013 – (no award)
 2012 – Ian Rankin
 2011 – Jackie Collins
 2010 – Martin Amis and Terry Pratchett
 2009 – (no award)
 2008 – J. K. Rowling 
 2007 – John Grisham
 2006 – Jamie Oliver
 2005 – Sir John Mortimer
 2004 – Sir David Attenborough
 2003 – Alan Bennett
 2002 – Mark Barty-King
 2001 – Ernest Hecht
 2000 – Spike Milligan
 1999 – Maeve Binchy
 1998 – Jilly Cooper
 1997 – Paul Scherer
 1996 – Wilbur Smith
 1995 – Delia Smith
 1994 – Catherine Cookson
 1993 – Dr. D. G. Hessayon

UK Author of the Year
Previously called Author of the Year. Renamed to UK Author of the Year in 2010, notwithstanding the fact the award has been given to non-UK authors.

 2014 – David Nicholls – Us
 2013 – Kate Atkinson – Life After Life 
 2012 – Hilary Mantel – Bring Up the Bodies
 2011 – Alan Hollinghurst – The Stranger's Child
 2010 – Hilary Mantel – Wolf Hall
 2009 – Aravind Adiga
 2008 – Ian McEwan
 2007 – Richard Dawkins
 2006 – Alan Bennett
 2005 – Sheila Hancock
 2004 – Alexander McCall Smith 
 2003 – Sarah Waters 
 2002 – Philip Pullman
 2001 – Nigella Lawson 
 2000 – J. K. Rowling
 1999 – Beryl Bainbridge
 1998 – Louis de Bernières 
 1997 – Bill Bryson 
 1996 – Salman Rushdie 
 1995 – Sebastian Faulks 
 1994 – Roddy Doyle 
 1993 – Andrew Morton
 1992 – Peter Mayle 
 1991 – Peter Ackroyd
 1990 – Prince of Wales

International Author of the Year
2014 – We Are All Completely Beside Ourselves – Karen Joy Fowler
2013 – Gone Girl – Gillian Flynn
2012 – The Snow Child – Eowyn Ivey
2011 – A Visit From the Goon Squad – Jennifer Egan
2010 – Freedom – Jonathan Franzen

Richard & Judy Best Read of the Year
 2009 – When Will There Be Good News? – Kate Atkinson (Doubleday)
 2008 – A Thousand Splendid Suns – Khaled Hosseini (Bloomsbury)
 2007 – The Interpretation of Murder – Jed Rubenfeld (Headline Review) 
 2006 – Labyrinth – Kate Mosse (Orion) 
 2005 – Cloud Atlas – David Mitchell (Sceptre) 
 2004 – The Lovely Bones – Alice Sebold (Picador)

The Children's Author of the Year
 1995 – Allan Ahlberg and Janet Ahlberg
 1994 – Anne Fine
 1993 – Raymond Briggs 
 1992 – Dick King-Smith
 1991 – Anne Fine
 1990 – Roald Dahl

Illustrated Children's Book of the Year 
 1995 – The Most Amazing Pop-Up Science Book – Jay Young (Watts Books) 
 1994 – Mummy Laid an Egg – Babette Cole (Jonathan Cape) 
 1993 – Penguin Small – Mick Inkpen (Hodder) 
 1992 – Farmer Duck – Helen Oxenbury (Walker Books) 
 1991 – The Mousehole Cat – Nicola Bayley (Walker Books)

Illustrated Book of the Year

 2004 – England's Thousand Best Houses – Simon Jenkins (Allen Lane) 
 2003 – Sahara – Michael Palin (Weidenfeld Nicolson Illustrated) 
 2002 – The Blue Planet – Andrew Byatt, Alastair Fothergill, Martha Holmes (BBC Worldwide) 
 2001 – The Beatles Anthology (Cassell) 
 2000 – Century – Bruce Bernard (Phaidon Press)
 1999 – Ethel & Ernest – Raymond Briggs (Jonathan Cape) 
 1998 – The Lost Gardens of Heligan – Tim Smit (Gollancz) 
 1997 – Flora Britannica – Richard Mabey (Sinclair-Stevenson) 
 1996 – The River Cafe Cookbook – Rose Gray and Ruth Rogers (Ebury Press) 
 1995 – The Art Book (Phaidon Press)

The TV and Film Book of the Year
 2007 – The Devil Wears Prada – Lauren Weisberger (HarperCollins) 
 2006 – The Constant Gardener – John le Carré (Hodder & Stoughton) 
 2005 – Himalaya – Michael Palin (Weidenfeld & Nicolson)
 2004 – How Clean Is Your House? – Kim Woodburn and Aggie MacKenzie (Michael Joseph) 
 2003 – What Not to Wear – Trinny Woodall and Susannah Constantine (Weidenfeld & Nicolson)

The Literary Fiction Award 
 2005 – Cloud Atlas – David Mitchell (Sceptre) 
 2004 – The Curious Incident of the Dog in the Night-Time – Mark Haddon (Jonathan Cape)

The History Book of the Year
 2005 – William Pitt the Younger: A Biography – William Hague (HarperCollins) 
 2004 – Stalin: The Court of the Red Tsar – Simon Sebag Montefiore (Weidenfeld & Nicolson)

The Sports Book of the Year 
 2007 – Gerrard: My Autobiography – Steven Gerrard (Bantam) 
 2006 – Being Freddie – Andrew Flintoff (Hodder & Stoughton) 
 2005 – Gazza: My Story – Paul Gascoigne (Headline)
 2004 – Martin Johnson: The Autobiography – Martin Johnson (Headline)

The deciBel Writer of the Year
 2007 – Jackie Kay
 2006 – Diana Evans
 2005 – Hari Kunzru

The Fastest Selling Biography of All Time 
 2004 – My Side – David Beckham (CollinsWillow)

The Travel Writer of the Year
 1993 – Michael Palin – Pole to Pole (BBC Books) 
 1992 – Mark Shand – Travels on my Elephant (Jonathan Cape) 
 1991 – V. S. Naipaul – India (Heinemann) 
 1990 – Peter Mayle – A Year in Provence (Hamish Hamilton)

The Fantasy and Science Fiction Author of the Year
 1994 – Terry Pratchett

See also

 List of British literary awards
 List of literary awards
 English literature
 British literature

References

External links
 
 

 

 
Awards established in 2010
British fiction awards
British non-fiction literary awards
Audiobook awards
Literary awards honoring writers
Literary awards honoring lifetime achievement
Biography awards
British children's literary awards
History awards
First book awards
Sports writing awards
1990 establishments in the United Kingdom
Annual events in the United Kingdom